Hedwig "Hedy" d'Ancona (born 1 October 1937) is a retired Dutch politician of the Labour Party (PvdA) and political activist.

d'Ancona applied at the University of Amsterdam in June 1956 majoring in Sociology and obtaining a Bachelor of Social Science degree in June 1958 before graduating with a Master of Social Science degree in July 1962. d'Ancona worked as a television producer for the VARA from November 1962 until September 1965 and as a researcher at the University of Amsterdam from September 1965 until November 1972. d'Ancona also worked as a political activist in the feminism movement and co-founded the feminist action group Man Woman Society in October 1968. d'Ancona worked as editor-in-chief of the feminist magazine Opzij from November 1972 until September 1981.

d'Ancona was elected as a Member of the Senate after the Senate election of 1974, taking office on 17 September 1974 serving as a frontbencher chairing the parliamentary committee for Housing and Spatial Planning and parliamentary committee for Culture, Recreation and Social Work and spokesperson for Emancipation and Gender equality. After the election of 1981 d'Ancona was appointed as State Secretary for Social Affairs and Employment in the Cabinet Van Agt II, taking office on 11 September 1981. The Cabinet Van Agt II fell just seven months into its term on 12 May 1982 and continued to serve in a demissionary capacity until the first cabinet formation of 1982 when it was replaced by the caretaker Cabinet Van Agt III on 29 May 1982 and she subsequently returned as a Member of the Senate following the resignation of Clovis Cnoop Koopmans, taking office on 31 August 1982 serving as a frontbencher and spokesperson for Health, Emancipation, Gender equality and Abortion. In June 1983 d'Ancona announced that she wouldn't stand for the Senate election of 1983 and continued to serve until the end of the parliamentary term on 13 September 1983. d'Ancona Rooy was elected as a Member of the European Parliament after the European Parliament election of 1984, taking office on 24 July 1984. After the election of 1989 d'Ancona was appointed as Minister of Welfare, Health and Culture in the Cabinet Lubbers III, taking office on 7 November 1989. In April 1994 d'Ancona announced that she wouldn't stand for the election of 1994 but wanted tot return to the European Parliament. On 16 July 1994 d'Ancona resigned as Minister of Welfare, Health and Culture after she was elected again as a Member of the European Parliament, serving from 19 July 1994 until 20 July 1999.

Biography

Education and academic career
Hedwig d'Ancona was born in The Hague in the Netherlands on 1 October 1937.

Politics
From 1989 to 1994 she was the Minister of Health, Welfare and Culture  (presently known as the Ministry of Health, Welfare and Sport as the responsibility for culture was transferred to the reorganized Ministry of Education, Science and Culture in 1994). She acted as State Secretary for Social Affairs and Employment for issues concerning women's liberation. She also served in the European Parliament and in the first chamber of the Dutch parliament, for the Labour Party.

Private sector
Outside of government, she is known for starting the feminist monthly Opzij as well as the special interest lobbying group, Man-Vrouw-Maatschappij (Man-Woman-Society), which she co-founded with Joke Smit. d'Ancona gave the 2015 Mosse Lecture, titled Voorbij de M/V-maatschappij? (Beyond the M/F society?).

Oxfam
From April 1995 through June 2004, d'Ancona was Chairwoman of Oxfam Novib (Oxfam Netherlands), serving also as Vice-Chairman of Oxfam International during part of her tenure.

Career
1962 - 1965: TV-producer for the VARA
1965 - 1975: Researcher in social geography at the University of Amsterdam
1974 - 1981: Member of the first chamber of Dutch parliament, for the Labour Party.
1975 - 1981: Director of Centrum Beleidsadviserend Onderzoek (Cebeon), a company that offers research-based advice to government and non-profit organisations, with Maurice de Hond	
September 1981 - May 1982: Secretary of State, Ministry of Welfare and Employment
August 1982 - September 1983: Member of Parliament
1984-1989: Member of the European Parliament
1989-1994: Minister of Welfare, Health and Culture
1994-1999: Member of European Parliament

Honors
In 1992, Hedy d'Ancona was awarded the Harriet Freezerring, a women's liberation prize, by the monthly Opzij she started. In 1994, she was named as a Knight of the Order of the Netherlands Lion. In 2002, she won the Aletta Jacobsprijs, a women's emancipation prize awarded by University of Groningen every two years.

Decorations

References

External links

  Drs. H. (Hedy) d' Ancona Parlement & Politiek
  Drs. H. d' Ancona (PvdA) Eerste Kamer der Staten-Generaal

 
 

1937 births
Living people
Anti-domestic violence activists
Anti-globalization activists
Dutch anti-poverty advocates
Commanders of the Order of the Netherlands Lion
Dutch feminists
Dutch humanitarians
Women humanitarians
Dutch human rights activists
Women human rights activists
Dutch geographers
Dutch Jews
Dutch lobbyists
Dutch magazine editors
Dutch nonprofit directors
Dutch nonprofit executives
Dutch people of German-Jewish descent
Dutch political writers
Dutch sociologists
Dutch women sociologists
Dutch television producers
Dutch women's rights activists
Jewish Dutch politicians
Jewish Dutch writers
Labour Party (Netherlands) MEPs
Labour Party (Netherlands) politicians
Members of the House of Representatives (Netherlands)
Members of the Senate (Netherlands)
MEPs for the Netherlands 1984–1989
MEPs for the Netherlands 1989–1994
MEPs for the Netherlands 1994–1999
20th-century women MEPs for the Netherlands
Ministers of Health of the Netherlands
Ministers of Sport of the Netherlands
Oxfam people
Politicians from Amsterdam
Politicians from The Hague
Social geographers
Dutch socialist feminists
State Secretaries for Social Affairs of the Netherlands
University of Amsterdam alumni
Academic staff of the University of Amsterdam
Women government ministers of the Netherlands
Dutch women television producers
Writers from Amsterdam
Writers from The Hague
20th-century Dutch journalists
Dutch women journalists
20th-century Dutch politicians
20th-century Dutch women writers
21st-century Dutch women writers